The Indian cricket team toured Bangladesh for two Test matches and three One Day Internationals in May 2007. The first match was played on 10 May, the first of three ODIs with India defeating Bangladesh by five wickets – less than two months after Bangladesh shocked India by defeating them by five wickets in the World Cup, leading to India's early exit from the competition. India completed the series win with a steady 46-run win, thanks largely in part to Gautam Gambhir's century. The third match was abandoned due to intermittent rain, resulting in a waterlogged pitch – brought on largely in part due to Cyclone Akash which had hit south Bangladesh earlier that day. Leading run scorer of the ODI series and Indian wicket-keeper Mahendra Singh Dhoni took home the player of the series award following a return to form with the bat and 3 dismissals behind the stumps. In the second test match Mohammad Ashraful scored the fastest test fifty in just 27 delivery.

The Test series ended in a 1–0 win for India; the first Test was affected by rain, helping Bangladesh secure a draw despite two declarations by India and a 149-run lead on first innings, but in the second Test India only lost three wickets in their three-day innings win.

Squad lists

Series and pre-series events

India
 4 April 2007: Greg Chappell resigns from his post of Indian national team coach.
 7 April 2007: Rahul Dravid retained as the Captain of the Test and ODI squad for three series, starting with India's tour of Bangladesh.
 7 April 2007: Ravi Shastri appointed as the coach of the Indian team for the Bangladesh tour. Venkatesh Prasad and Robin Singh appointed as coaches for bowling and fielding respectively.
 20 April 2007: Sachin Tendulkar and Sourav Ganguly rested from the ODI squad but retained in the test squad. Harbhajan Singh, Irfan Pathan and Ajit Agarkar were dropped from both the squads. Virender Sehwag was dropped from the test squad but retained in the ODI squad. Three Debutants for the tour – Manoj Tiwari and Piyush Chawla in the ODI squad and Rajesh Pawar in the test squad.
 8 May 2007: Manoj Tiwari's shoulder injury during practice in Dhaka sidelines hims for the ODI series. No replacements were sought by the team.
 15 May 2007:  Sreesanth returns home with a calf muscle injury. Rudra Pratap Singh was retained as his replacement.
 17 May 2007: Sachin Tendulkar was appointed vice-captain of the Indian test team for the Bangladesh series on the eve of the first Test match.
 17 May 2007: Munaf Patel leaves the tour on the first day of the first Test following injury. Ishant Sharma is called up to replace him.

Bangladesh
 20 April 2007: Bangladesh national cricket coach Dav Whatmore resigns from his post effective at the end of the India tour of Bangladesh.
 30 April 2007: Mohammad Ashraful is appointed as the vice-captain for the ODI squad. The selectors announce only the ODI squad and take a decision to name the Test squad after the end of the ODI series.
 12 May 2007: Bangladesh announce their test squad side following the loss of the ODI series. Aftab Ahmed, Abdur Razzak dropped alongside wicket-keeper Mushfiqur Rahim who has been replaced by veteran Khaled Mashud, who had been left out of the World Cup team.

ODI series

1st ODI

2nd ODI

Gautam Gambhir's 101 was the first century to be made at the Sher-e-Bangla Mirpur Stadium and went on to help India to make the highest team total scored on the ground.

3rd ODI

The pitch was washed out due to heavy rain from the previous two days, along with heavy winds from Cyclone Akash taking their toll on the ground conditions. Four and a half hours after the planned start time the umpires called off the match, anticipating another 2 hours from 13:00 (BST) would be needed – not leaving enough time for the minimum of 20 overs each to be played. The presentation of awards, including most wickets taken (picked up by Syed Rasel of Bangladesh), most runs scored and player of the series (both won by MS Dhoni of India), were handed out at the ground later in the day.

Test series

1st test

2nd test

References

External links
 Tour home at ESPN Cricinfo

2007 in Bangladeshi cricket
2007 in Indian cricket
Bangladeshi cricket seasons from 2000–01
2007
International cricket competitions in 2007